Boris Isaakovich Gorev  (4 December 1874, Vilno – 27 December 1937) was a revolutionary and writer who was active in both he Bolshevik and Menshevik wings of the Russian Social Democratic and Labour Party.

He was the son of Isaak Meerovich Goldman. His younger brother Mikhail Goldman (aka Mark Liber) was a founding member of the General Jewish Labour Bund ("the Bund"). His sister Julia Goldman married Felix Dzerzhinsky, but she died of tuberculosis in 1904.

He was arrested in 1937 during the great purge, and was then shot.

Works
 Materialism: Philosophy of the Proletariat 1920 Moscow. A Chinese translation by Qu Qiubai was published which Mao Tse-tung read.

References

1874 births
1937 deaths
Writers from the Russian Empire
Soviet philosophers
Great Purge victims from Russia
People from Vilnius
Place of death missing